"Lullaby for You" is Jyongri's third single released in Japan under the label EMI Music Japan on December 13, 2006. It peaked at No. 8 on the Oricon Daily Charts and at No. 12 on the Oricon Weekly Charts. The A-side track, "Lullaby for You" is used in the end credits for the video game The World Ends with You. The B-side track "Catch Me" was produced by American producers Jimmy Jam and Terry Lewis.

Track listing
 Lullaby for You
 Catch me (produced by Jimmy Jam & Terry Lewis)
 Lovers DRIVE
 ~Yakusoku~ Live Version (~Promise~)
 Lullaby for You (Instrumental)
 Catch me (Instrumental)
 Lovers DRIVE (Instrumental)

2006 singles